Saketh Myneni and Sanam Singh won the title defeating John Paul Fruttero and Vijay Sundar Prashanth in the final 5–7, 6–4, [10–2].

Seeds

Draw

References
 Main Draw

2015 ATP Challenger Tour